The Women's National Basketball Association's Defensive Player of the Year Award is an annual Women's National Basketball Association (WNBA) award given since the league's inaugural season -- 1997, to the top defensive player of the regular season. The winner is selected by a panel of sportswriters and broadcasters throughout the United States, each of whom casts a vote for first, second and third place selections. Each first-place vote is worth five points; each second-place vote is worth three points; and each third-place vote is worth one point. The player with the highest point total, regardless of the number of first-place votes, wins the award.

Tamika Catchings has won the defensive player of the year award more times than any other player with the record of 5.

Winners

Multi-time winners

See also

 List of sports awards honoring women

References

Awards established in 1997
Defensive